Stephanotrypeta brevicosta is a species of tephritid or fruit flies in the genus Stephanotrypeta of the family Tephritidae.

Distribution
Sudan, Kenya.

References

Tephritinae
Insects described in 1931
Diptera of Africa